Artichoke Creek is a stream in the U.S. state of South Dakota.

Artichoke Creek was named on account of the wild artichokes along its course.

See also
List of rivers of South Dakota

References

Rivers of Potter County, South Dakota
Rivers of Sully County, South Dakota
Rivers of South Dakota